The village of Bani Saleh is one of the villages of the center Fashn Beni Suef Arab Republic of Egypt. According to 2006 statistics, the total population was 10171 people, of whom 5249 were men and 4922 women.

See also 

 Beni Suef
 List of villages in Beni Suef Governorate

References

Villages in Egypt
Populated places in Beni Suef Governorate